Guildford Golf Club is a private members golf club located in Merrow, Guildford, England. Founded in 1886, it is the oldest golf club in the county of Surrey.

History 
Until 1870, the golf course was actually a race course. Laid out on land that was once part of the Onslow Estate, the club was founded by Colonel W. Bannatyne, Major W. Pontifex and Mr E.L. Hooper. The 4th Earl of Onslow gave his support to the project, and so became the President of the club. Originally, the course was just six holes in length, but by the early 1900s it had expanded to eighteen and the clubhouse was built.

Clubhouse 
The modern clubhouse was officially opened in 1998 by Peter Alliss. The clubhouse looks out over the Downs, with attractive views of the 18th hole. The club website states that the clubhouse has been "widely acclaimed as one of the best in the South East of England".

The course 
The course is an 18-hole parkland golf course set on the North Downs. It measures 6090 yards off the men's competition tees and has a par of 69. Being situated on chalk, it is seen as a good all-weather course. Often, there is a fairly strong wind across the Downs, significantly increasing the difficulty of the course.

External links 
Guildford Golf Club website

Golf clubs and courses in Surrey
Sports venues completed in 1886
Sports venues in Guildford